Jack Whitten (25 January 1922 – 20 November 1980) was an  Australian rules footballer who played with Geelong in the Victorian Football League (VFL).

Notes

External links 

1922 births
1980 deaths
Australian rules footballers from Victoria (Australia)
Geelong Football Club players
Australian Army personnel of World War II
Australian Army soldiers